Rinorea villosiflora is a species of plant in the family Violaceae. It is endemic to Brazil.

References

Endemic flora of Brazil
villosiflora
Endangered plants
Taxonomy articles created by Polbot